The Head of the River rowing regatta refers to two New South Wales school rowing competitions, one for boys and one for girls.

AAGPS Head of the River Regatta

The AAGPS Head of the River regatta takes place in Penrith, New South Wales, Australia every March at the Sydney International Regatta Centre (SIRC). It is the culmination of the GPS (Great Public Schools) rowing season for senior crews.

From 1893 until 1935, the Regatta was held on the Parramatta River in Port Jackson – in early years from Putney to Gladesville and in later years from the Yaralla Estate at Concord to Cabarita. From 1936 until 1996 it was raced on the Nepean River and finishing near the Nepean Bridge. Since 1996 it's been held on the Sydney Olympic course at Penrith. From 1893 until 1909 the blue-riband race was contested by four-oared boats, and since then by eight-oared boats with coxed fours contesting the minor events. By the 1930s when the eight Sydney GPS schools were competing the event on the Parramatta River, two heats of four lanes were raced and then a final was contested by the top four. Since 1996 the 1st and 2nd VIIIs race over 2000 metres. Previous events had the eights race over a mile and a half (excepting in 1946 and 1947 – a mile and a quarter) and fours racing over a mile. Up until the 1930s there was limited school participation in the regattas of the Sydney club rowing season and for many of the school squads the Head of the River was the sole and highlight race of their rowing season. In those days the race was of great public interest and the regatta drew a huge flotilla of chartered ferries and vessels which would moor off Putney, Tennyson Point and Cabarita.

As of 2021, all of the nine of the GPS schools, Sydney Grammar School, The King's School, Newington College, Sydney Boys High School, The Scots College, St. Joseph's College, Saint Ignatius' College, The Armidale School and Shore School, send their eights to the Head of the River. Prior to 2021, The Armidale School did not send their eight to the regatta. In 2012 The Armidale School started sending fours, and the first IV race of 2013 was historic as the first time crews from all nine GPS schools competed. One of the most successful coaches of rowing among the schools was Robert Buntine at King's and Newington from 1966 until 1996.

It is the last race of the official GPS rowing season, and usually follows the Riverview Gold Cup held on the Lane Cove River. The Head of the River is one week after other summer sports premierships – cricket and basketball – have finished. This enables over ten thousand school students and other supporters to attend.

The current (SIRC) record time (and former junior world record until 2001) for the 1st VIII is 5:42.6 set by Shore on 23 March 1996, in the first year that the race was held at SIRC. The most recent winner of the AAGPS Head of the River, and holder of the Major Rennie Trophy is The Kings School winning the regatta in 2021 with a time of 5:54:47 ahead of Shore (5:57:35) and Scots College (5:57:69).

NSW Schoolgirls Head of The River
The NSW Schoolgirls Head of the River was first raced in 1991. The inaugural Schoolgirls Head of the River Regatta took place on Middle Harbour Creek at Davidson Park, Roseville. In following years the event was held at Iron Cove.

The NSW Schoolgirls' Head of the River held at the Sydney International Regatta Centre (SIRC), in Penrith on the Sunday following the Schoolboys Head of the River. It is organised by the NSW Combined Independent Schools Sports Council (NSWCISSC) and is the culmination of the Schoolgirls' rowing season.

The current (SIRC) record time for the 1st VIII in the Schoolgirl Head of the River is 6:40 set by Queenwood School for Girls on 25 March 2017. The most recent winner of the NSW Schoolgirl Head of the River is Pymble Ladies' College.
Unlike the boys race, all affiliated schools of the NSWCISSC, NSW Combined High Schools Sports Association (NSWCHSSA), and the NSW Combined Catholic Colleges Sports association (NSWCCCSA), are eligible to nominate their students to compete in the girls regatta. As at 2008, ten of the thirty AHIGS schools, those being Ascham School, Canberra Girls' Grammar School, Loreto Kirribilli, Loreto Normanhurst, MLC School, Presbyterian Ladies' College, Sydney, Pymble Ladies' College, Queenwood School for Girls, Roseville College, and Tara Anglican School for Girls, send their crews to the Head of the River, making up the bulk of entries. The regatta is becoming increasingly popular among girls crews from public and private non-AHIGS schools, most notably, St Paul's Grammar School, Kinross Wolaroi School, Sydney Girls High School, SCECGS Redlands, North Sydney Girls High School, Riverside Girls High School and Radford College.

The New South Wales Rowing Association (NSWRA) holds ten perpetual trophies in trust for competition at the Schoolgirls regatta:
 the NSW Union of Ex-Oarswomen Rose Evans trophy for competition between schoolgirl first eights.
 the University of Sydney Women's Sports Association trophy for competition between schoolgirl first coxed fours – now awarded to the schoolgirl second eight.
 the Union of Boat Race Officials shield for competition between schoolgirl Senior coxed quadruple sculls.
 the University of NSW Trophy for competition between schoolgirl open fours (not awarded in 2007 due to a change in program format).
 the NSW Union of Oarswomen Golden Scull Trophy for competition between single scullers.
 the Margaret Varady Trophy for competition between schoolgirl year 10 coxed quads.
 the Betty Deer Rosebowl for the highest aggregate point score between competing schools.
 the William McKeith Trophy for the Junior handicap point score.
 the Carol Bowern Shield for the Senior handicap point score.
 the Janet Freeman Trophy for the Year 8 Coxed Quad Scull.

AAGPS Head of the River Regatta winners
Since 2009 the regatta consists of eleven races.

1893 to 1999

Year 2000 and onwards

The 1st VIII – Major Rennie Trophy

The current (SIRC) record time for the 1st VIII is 5:42.06 set by the Shore School on 23 March 1996.

Below Lists the most successful schools in the 1st VIII event (wins):
 Shore School (51)
 King's School (17)
 Sydney Grammar School (16)
 Newington College (14)
 (Equal 5th) Saint Ignatius' College (9)
 (Equal 5th) Saint Joseph's College (9)
 Sydney Boys High School (8)
 The Scots College (5)
 The Armidale School (0)

The 2nd VIII – L C Robson Memorial Trophy

Below Lists the most successful schools in the 2nd VIII event (wins) (From 2000 onward):
 Shore School (14)
 (Equal 2nd) King’s School (2)
 (Equal 2nd) Saint Joseph's College (2)
 (Equal 2nd) Saint Ignatius' College (2)
 (Equal 5th) Newington College (1)
 (equal 5th) Scots (1)
 Sydney Grammar School (0)
 Sydney Boys High School (0)
 The Armidale School (0)

The 1st IV – Yaralla Cup

The 2nd IV – Allan Callaway Trophy

The 3rd IV – Father Gartlan Trophy

The 4th IV – Penrith City Council Cup

The 3rd VIII

In 2001, the following four races were added to the regatta. These are held before the IVs and the 2nd and 1st VIII race.

The 1st Year 10 VIII

The current (SIRC) record time for the 1st Year 10 VIII is 6:08.67 set by St Ignatius College on 13 March 2021.

The 2nd Year 10 VIII

The 3rd Year 10 VIII

Due to an unprecedented depth in the number of junior rowers, the 4th Year 10 VIII race was added to the regatta in 2009.

The 4th Year 10 VIII

NSW Schoolgirls Head of the River Regatta Results

Regatta winners

See also
Head of the River (Australia)
Athletic Association of the Great Public Schools of New South Wales
Association of Heads of Independent Girls' Schools

References

External links
Rowing Australia 
NSW Rowing
Sydney International Rowing Centre
AAGPS
NSWCIS

Rowing competitions in Australia
Sport in New South Wales
Association of Heads of Independent Girls' Schools
Private schools in New South Wales
Recurring sporting events established in 1893
Sports competitions in Sydney
Athletic Association of the Great Public Schools of New South Wales
Penrith, New South Wales